Monika Warnicka (born 26 April 1969 in Przemyśl) is a retired Polish athlete who specialised in the 400 metres hurdles. She represented her country at two World Championships, in 1993 and 1995.

Her personal best in the event is 55.82 seconds set in Rome in 1993.

Competition record

References

1969 births
Living people
Polish female hurdlers
People from Przemyśl
World Athletics Championships athletes for Poland
Universiade medalists in athletics (track and field)
Universiade bronze medalists for Poland
Competitors at the 1993 Summer Universiade
Competitors at the 1995 Summer Universiade
Competitors at the 1997 Summer Universiade
Medalists at the 1991 Summer Universiade